The Dynamite Fighting Show (DFS) is a Romanian kickboxing, Muay Thai, mixed martial arts (MMA), boxing, kyokushin and taekwondo promotion company based in Bucharest, Romania, which is owned by veteran heavyweight star Cătălin Moroșanu. It is the most popular combat sports and kickboxing promotion company in Romania. Former head of media and marketing for SUPERKOMBAT Alin Huiu has been managing director since its inception.

It promoted the first sanctioned professional event in the Romanian capital on July 5, 2018, when DFS promoted the "super fight" between Moroșanu and Freddy Kemayo.

In Romania, it can be seen on Pro TV and Pro X. On 5 March 2020 DFS started airing live events on Sport Extra with the debut event on Sport Extra being Dynamite Fighting Show 7.

It has a strategic partnership with ISKA.

In May 2022, DFS signed a distribution agreement with five American networks. The partnership through UFA will have 120 broadcasts on NBC Sports, AT&T, Stadium, NSN and Ocean 7 WXVO in the United States.

History
Following the dissolution of the largest continental and popular Superkombat Fighting Championship, several new promotions started to dominate the scene in Romania. The professional kickboxing industry lacked a viable competitor to Colosseum Tournament which Cătălin Moroșanu attempted to fill with the formation of Dynamite Fighting Show.

Ratings
Also enjoying the popularity of Cătălin Moroșanu, after the  dissolution of the SUPERKOMBAT it became the most popular combat sports promotion in the country.

In 2018, after Pro TV and its subsidiary Pro X ended the partnership with SUPERKOMBAT, together with the Dynamite Fighting Show they announced a multi-year broadcast deal.

The promotion's first broadcast television event was DFS 1: Moroșanu vs. Kemayo. In the main event, Cătălin Moroșanu and Freddy Kemayo met for the third time in the kickboxing ring. Moroșanu dominated the bout, leading to a unanimous decision victory.

The broadcast scored a 7.3 rating and 30 share, making it the most watched combat sports event in the past 7 years. The main event peaked with a share of 40.2 in the 18-49 demographic.

DFS Events
DFS's first event, Dynamite Fighting Show 1, took place on July 5, 2018. Each DFS event contains several fights. Traditionally, every event starts off with an opening fight followed by other fights, with the last fight being known as the main event.

Tellur Cup
Since its founding in 2019, Tellur Cup for junior kickboxers under-18 has served as a farm system (developmental territory) for DFS's future main roster. The competition takes place in the ring, but also on the tatami. The winners usually receive a scholarship consisting of participating in the ISKA World Championships. 2019 winners Ștefan Lătescu and Marko Dușinschi their professional debuts in 2020 and 2021 respectively.

Champions

DFS Heavyweight Championship

DFS Lightweight Championship

Notable fighters

Kickboxing
  Cătălin Moroșanu 
  Andrei Stoica
  Bogdan Stoica
  Amansio Paraschiv
  Sebastian Cozmâncă
  Florin Lambagiu
  Ștefan Lătescu
  Eduard Gafencu 
  Cristian Ristea
  Ștefan Orza
  Andrei Ostrovanu 
  Bogdan Năstase
  Adrian Maxim
  Alex Bublea
  Ionuț Iancu
  Claudiu Bădoi
  Constantin Rusu
  Freddy Kemayo
  Diaguely Camara
  Daniel Stefanovski
  Daniel Sam
  Chico Kwasi 
  Diogo Neves

Mixed martial arts
  Ion Pascu
  Anatoli Ciumac

Boxing
  Benjamin Adegbuyi
  Mihai Nistor
  Flavius Biea

Kyokushin
  Eldar Ismailov

Taekwondo
  Artem Byelov

See also
 DFS in 2021
 Colosseum Tournament
 Golden Fighter Championship
 KO Masters
 OSS Fighters

Notes

References

External links
   
Dynamite Fighting Show's channel on YouTube
Tellur Kickboxing Cup - Powered by Dynamite Fighting Show  
Sport Extra

2018 establishments in Romania
Kickboxing organizations
Mixed martial arts organizations
Professional boxing organizations
Professional Muay Thai organizations
Karate organizations
Taekwondo organizations
Sports organizations established in 2018
Companies based in Bucharest